The Afro-Asia Cup was a cricket competition played two times in 2005 and 2007.

Editions
 2005 Afro-Asia Cup
 2007 Afro-Asia Cup
 2023 Afro-Asia Cup

References

 
One Day International cricket competitions
Cricket in Asia
Biennial sporting events